Rosewood is an unincorporated community located in Muhlenberg County, Kentucky, United States.

History
The community was named for the abundance of rosewood.

Geography
The community is located along Kentucky Route 973 in southern Muhlenberg County.

In popular culture
Rosewood and neighboring towns such as Muldraugh, West Point, Kentucky, and Riverside, Kentucky are the main setting of the open world survival horror game Project Zomboid.

Notable people
Merle Travis, country singer and guitarist.

References

Unincorporated communities in Muhlenberg County, Kentucky
Unincorporated communities in Kentucky